North Khorasan University of Medical Sciences is a public university in Bojnord, Iran. The University has four faculties including medicine, dentistry, health care, and nursing and two satellite schools in Shirvan and Ashkhaneh.

References

External links
 "Official Website of the North Khorasan University of Medical Sciences"

North Khorasan, University of Medical Sciences
North Khorasan, University of Medical Sciences
Education in North Khorasan Province
Buildings and structures in North Khorasan Province
1991 establishments in Iran